Tysons (also known as Tysons Central 123 and Tysons I & II during planning phases) is a rapid transit station on the Silver Line of the Washington Metro in Tysons, Virginia. One of four Metro stations in Tysons, it is one of the five stations comprising the first phase of the Silver Line. It opened as Tysons Corner on July 26, 2014.

Station layout

Like other stations on the Silver Line, Tysons has an elevated island platform and two tracks with the western side of the platform facing a tunnel portal on an open cut. Access is provided by two entrances, one at street level at the northwest corner of the intersection of Chain Bridge Road and Tysons Boulevard and the other on the southwest corner; the sitting of the railway viaduct on the north side of Chain Bridge Road as well as pedestrian safety means that entrance to the station from this corner is by a pedestrian overpass to a mezzanine above platform level.

History and location

Tysons Corner station opened as part of the first phase of the Silver Line to Wiehle–Reston East in 2014. In the planning stages, controversy ensued over whether to build the Metro in a tunnel or on an elevated viaduct through Tysons. It was eventually decided that the majority of the line would be built above ground, but the station was built partially below ground in order to send trains through a short tunnel connecting the line's Route 7 and Route 123-paralleling sections.

One of four Metro stations within Tysons, the station is located in the heart of the edge city. Specifically, it lies above Chain Bridge Road (VA 123) at its intersection with Tysons Boulevard.

This station reopened beginning on August 16, 2020, when trains were able to bypass East Falls Church station.

Name change
In November 2020, WMATA approved a request from Fairfax County to change the name of Tysons Corner station to Tysons. The new name became effective on September 11, 2022.

Transit-oriented development

In order to reduce congestion and improve walkability and connectivity in the area, the Fairfax County Planning Commission created the "Tysons Corner Urban Center Comprehensive Plan", an outline for the urbanization of Tysons in conjunction with the opening of the Silver Line. As one of four Metro stations within the identified locale, the station is the focal point of one of the transit-oriented development schemes in the plan. According to the commission's outline, the area bounded by Westpark Drive, International Drive, Route 123, Route 7 and the Capital Beltway will be designated as the Tysons Central 7 District and contain high-density residential and commercial mixed-use development.

The plan envisions two major subdistricts, the North and South Tysons Central subdistricts, along with additional satellite subareas near the edges of the planning district.

Additional changes are envisioned for the Towers Crescent and Watson Street subareas.

References

External links

Railway stations in the United States opened in 2014
Stations on the Silver Line (Washington Metro)
Transportation in Fairfax County, Virginia
Washington Metro stations in Virginia
2014 establishments in Virginia
Tysons, Virginia